Chah Gah or Chah-i-Gah or Chah-e Gah or Chahgah may refer to:
 Chah Gah, Dashti, Bushehr Province
 Chah Gah, Tangestan, Bushehr Province
 Chah Gah, Armand, Chaharmahal and Bakhtiari Province
 Chahgah-e Milas, Chaharmahal and Bakhtiari Province
 Chahgah, Sardasht, Chaharmahal and Bakhtiari Province
 Chah-e Gah, Kohgiluyeh and Boyer-Ahmad